"Confession" is a song written by Rodney Clawson, Ross Copperman, and Matt Jenkins, and recorded by American country music duo Florida Georgia Line. It is the fifth and final single from their second studio album, Anything Goes.

History
Florida Georgia Line debuted the single at the 2015 Country Music Association (CMA) awards telecast in November 2015. Brian Kelley, one-half of the duo, told Nash Country Weekly that "[It] bookends the album—with 'Dirt' really well... I think it closes the Anything Goes chapter."

Content
The song is a mid-tempo ballad about a man who "takes a late-night drive through the country in an attempt to clear his brain" and "takes stock of his life", ultimately praying to God while drinking beer.

Critical reception
An uncredited article about Anything Goes published by Taste of Country stated that "The songwriters penned a chorus that's both emotional and sonically satisfying, and Moi does a fine job in amplifying the message."

Commercial performance
The song first entered the chart at No. 39 on Billboard's Hot Country Songs chart, and No. 47 on the Country Airplay chart on its release. The song peaked at No. 7 on Hot Country Songs for chart dated April 9, 2016, and topped the Country Airplay chart dated May 7, 2016. Florida Georgia Line joined Zac Brown Band as the only country acts to have four songs reaching No. 1 on Country Airplay from each of their first two albums. The song has sold 293,000 copies in the US as of May 2016.  It was certified Platinum by the RIAA on May 23, 2017.

Music video
TK McKamy directed the music video.

Charts

Weekly chart

Year end charts

Certifications

References

2014 songs
2015 singles
Country ballads
2010s ballads
Florida Georgia Line songs
Republic Nashville singles
Songs written by Rodney Clawson
Songs written by Ross Copperman
Songs written by Matt Jenkins
Song recordings produced by Joey Moi
Music videos directed by TK McKamy
Republic Records singles